"Wee Rule" is a song by British hip hop duo Wee Papa Girl Rappers. Released in 1988 as the third single from their debut album The Beat, the Rhyme, the Noise, the song was a top 20 hit in at least nine countries, making it the duo's biggest and best known hit song.

Track listing
UK 12" single
A. "Wee Rule" (Ragamuffin Mix) - 4:59
B. "Rebel Rap" - 3:07

UK 7" single
A. "Wee Rule" - 3:26
B. "Rebel Rap" - 3:31

Charts

References

1988 songs
1988 singles
Wee Papa Girl Rappers songs
Jive Records singles